BPW may refer to:

 Business and Professional Women's Foundation
 Lupeol synthase, an enzyme
 Bristol Parkway railway station in England (station code)